Dipu Halder (born 9 May 2003) is an Indian professional footballer who plays as a defender for I-League club Mohammedan.

Career
Dipu Halder made his first professional appearance for Indian Arrows on 10 January 2021 against Churchill Brothers.

Career statistics

References

2003 births
Living people
Footballers from West Bengal
Indian footballers
Indian Arrows players
I-League players
Association football defenders
Mohammedan SC (Kolkata) players